Joseph Very Quarles, Jr., (December 16, 1843October 7, 1911) was an American lawyer, politician, and Wisconsin pioneer.  He served as a United States senator from Wisconsin and a United States district judge for the Eastern District of Wisconsin. Earlier in his career, he was the 20th mayor of Kenosha, Wisconsin, and served as an officer in the Union Army during the American Civil War.

Early life

Born on December 16, 1843, in Kenosha (then Southport), Wisconsin Territory (State of Wisconsin from May 29, 1848). Quarles was the son of Joseph V. Quarles, Sr. and  Caroline ( Bullen).daughter of John Bullen IV—commonly known as John Bullen, Sr.  John Bullen IV had been a captain in the New York militia during the War of 1812 and subsequently served as a brigadier general in the Wisconsin Territory militia.  Caroline's older brothers, John and William, established the first settlement at what is now Kenosha, Wisconsin.

Quarles had one brother, Charles, who would become his law partner.

Quarles attended the common schools, then received an Artium Baccalaureus degree in 1866 from the University of Michigan and a Bachelor of Laws in 1867 from the University of Michigan Law School.

During the American Civil War, Quarles served in the Union Army in the Thirty-ninth Regiment, Wisconsin Volunteers, and was mustered out as first lieutenant.

Career 
He was admitted to the bar and entered private practice in Kenosha from 1868 to 1882. He was the district attorney for Kenosha County, Wisconsin from 1870 to 1876. He was the Mayor of Kenosha in 1876. He was a member of the Wisconsin State Assembly in 1879. He was a member of the Wisconsin State Senate from 1880 to 1882. He resumed private practice in Racine, Wisconsin from 1882 to 1888, and in Milwaukee, Wisconsin from 1888 to 1899.

Congressional service 

Quarles was elected as a Republican to the United States Senate and served from March 4, 1899, to March 3, 1905. He was not a candidate for reelection in 1905. He was Chairman of the Committee on Transportation Routes to the Seaboard for the 56th United States Congress and Chairman of the Committee on the Census for the 57th and 58th United States Congresses.

Federal judicial service 
Quarles was nominated by President Theodore Roosevelt on March 6, 1905, to a seat on the United States District Court for the Eastern District of Wisconsin vacated by Judge William Henry Seaman.

U.S. Senate 
He was confirmed by the United States Senate on March 6, 1905, and received his commission the same day. His service terminated on October 7, 1911, due to his death.

Personal life

Quarles died in Milwaukee. He was interred in the City Cemetery in Kenosha.

References

External links

 
 
 

Republican Party Wisconsin state senators
Republican Party members of the Wisconsin State Assembly
Mayors of Kenosha, Wisconsin
Judges of the United States District Court for the Eastern District of Wisconsin
District attorneys in Wisconsin
Union Army officers
People of Wisconsin in the American Civil War
University of Michigan Law School alumni
1843 births
1911 deaths
United States district court judges appointed by Theodore Roosevelt
20th-century American judges
Republican Party United States senators from Wisconsin
19th-century American politicians
19th-century American judges